Aintree Central railway station was a station located on the North Liverpool Extension Line on Park Lane, Aintree, Merseyside, across Park Lane from the current Aintree station.

History
The station opened on 13 July 1880 as Aintree Racecourse for racedays at Aintree Racecourse. It was renamed Aintree on the opening of the Southport & Cheshire Lines Extension Railway on 1 September 1884. In 1950 it was renamed once more becoming Aintree Central.

The line was opened by the Cheshire Lines Committee (CLC), in direct competition with the L&Y's Liverpool Exchange to Southport Chapel Street service. However, it was never as successful because the CLC's route was much longer than that of the L&Y, serving areas within South Liverpool and along to Hunts Cross, before going north again up to Aintree.

On 7 January 1952 the Liverpool Central to Southport Lord Street service ended, leaving Aintree Central as the terminus for all trains from Liverpool.

The station finally closed to passengers on 7 November 1960 and then to race traffic in March 1963. It finally closed on 7 December 1964 with the withdrawal of freight traffic (except for private sidings).

Today, no evidence of the station's existence remains, as the site is buried under an industrial estate, located off Park Lane.

References

Sources

External links
 Aintree Central via Disused Stations UK
 The station on a 1948 OS Map via npe maps
 The station on an 1888-1913 Overlay OS Map via National Library of Scotland
 Photos of the station via ukurbex
 Remains of the station in 1986 via flickr

Railway stations in Great Britain opened in 1880
Railway stations in Great Britain closed in 1960
Former Cheshire Lines Committee stations
Disused railway stations in the Metropolitan Borough of Sefton